Demirhan is a village in the District of Sultanhisar, Aydın Province, Turkey. As of 2010, it had a population of 750 people.

References

Villages in Sultanhisar District